The intimal cushion is smooth muscle in the center of arteries that paradoxically keep the artery patent by serving as valves. It is present in Helicine arteries of penis and in the patent ductus arteriosus.

References 

Angiology